

Events

Pre-1600
 475 – Byzantine Emperor Zeno is forced to flee his capital at Constantinople, and his general, Basiliscus gains control of the empire.
1528 – Gustav I of Sweden is crowned King of Sweden, having already reigned since his election in June 1523.
1554 – Bayinnaung, who would go on to assemble the largest empire in the history of Southeast Asia, is crowned King of Burma.

1601–1900
1616 – The city of Belém, Brazil is founded on the Amazon River delta, by Portuguese captain Francisco Caldeira Castelo Branco.
1792 – Federalist Thomas Pinckney appointed first U.S. minister to Britain.
1808 – John Rennie's scheme to defend St Mary's Church, Reculver, founded in 669, from coastal erosion is abandoned in favour of demolition, despite the church being an exemplar of Anglo-Saxon architecture and sculpture.
  1808   – The organizational meeting leading to the creation of the Wernerian Natural History Society, a former Scottish learned society, is held in Edinburgh.
1848 – The Palermo rising takes place in Sicily against the Bourbon Kingdom of the Two Sicilies.
1866 – The Royal Aeronautical Society is formed in London.
1872 – Yohannes IV is crowned Emperor of Ethiopia in Axum, the first imperial coronation in that city in over 200 years.
1895 – The National Trust is founded in the United Kingdom.

1901–present
1911 – The University of the Philippines College of Law is formally established; three future Philippine presidents are among the first enrollees.
1915 – The United States House of Representatives rejects a proposal to require states to give women the right to vote.
1916 – Both Oswald Boelcke and Max Immelmann, for achieving eight aerial victories each over Allied aircraft, receive the German Empire's highest military award, the Pour le Mérite as the first German aviators to earn it. 
1918 – The Minnie Pit Disaster coal mining accident occurs in Halmer End, Staffordshire, in which 155 men and boys die.
1932 – Hattie Caraway becomes the first woman elected to the United States Senate.
1942 – World War II: United States President Franklin D. Roosevelt creates the National War Labor Board.
1945 – World War II: The Red Army begins the Vistula–Oder Offensive.
1955 – A Martin 2-0-2 and Douglas DC-3 collide over Boone County, Kentucky, killing 15 people.
1962 – Vietnam War: Operation Chopper, the first American combat mission in the war, takes place.
1964 – Rebels in Zanzibar begin a revolt known as the Zanzibar Revolution and proclaim a republic.
1966 – Lyndon B. Johnson states that the United States should stay in South Vietnam until Communist aggression there is ended.
1967 – Dr. James Bedford becomes the first person to be cryonically preserved with intent of future resuscitation.
1969 – The New York Jets of the American Football League defeat the Baltimore Colts of the National Football League to win Super Bowl III in what is considered to be one of the greatest upsets in sports history.
1970 – Biafra capitulates, ending the Nigerian Civil War.
1971 – The Harrisburg Seven: Rev. Philip Berrigan and five other activists are indicted on charges of conspiring to kidnap Henry Kissinger and of plotting to blow up the heating tunnels of federal buildings in Washington, D.C.
1976 – The United Nations Security Council votes 11–1 to allow the Palestine Liberation Organization to participate in a Security Council debate (without voting rights).
1986 – Space Shuttle program: Congressman (and future NASA Administrator) Bill Nelson lifts off from Kennedy Space Center aboard Columbia on mission STS-61-C as a payload specialist.
1990 – A seven-day pogrom breaks out against the Armenian civilian population of Baku, Azerbaijan, during which Armenians were beaten, tortured, murdered, and expelled from the city. 
1991 – Persian Gulf War: An act of the U.S. Congress authorizes the use of American military force to drive Iraq out of Kuwait.
1997 – Space Shuttle program: Atlantis launches from the Kennedy Space Center on mission STS-81 to the Russian space station Mir, carrying astronaut Jerry M. Linenger for a four-month stay on board the station, replacing astronaut John E. Blaha.
1998 – Nineteen European nations agree to forbid human cloning.
2001 – Downtown Disney opens to the public as part of the Disneyland Resort in Anaheim, California.
2004 – The world's largest ocean liner, makes its maiden voyage.
2005 – Deep Impact launches from Cape Canaveral on a Delta II rocket.
2006 – A stampede during the Stoning of the Devil ritual on the last day at the Hajj in Mina, Saudi Arabia, kills at least 362 Muslim pilgrims.
2007 – Comet C/2006 P1 (McNaught), one of the brightest comets ever observed is at its zenith visible during the day.
2010 – An earthquake in Haiti occurs, killing between 220,000 and 300,000 people and destroying much of the capital Port-au-Prince.
2012 – Violent protests occur in Bucharest, Romania, as two-day-old demonstrations continue against President Traian Băsescu's economic austerity measures. Clashes are reported in numerous Romanian cities between protesters and law enforcement officers. 
2015 – Government raids kill 143 Boko Haram fighters in Kolofata, Cameroon.
2016 – Ten people are killed and 15 wounded in a bombing near the Blue Mosque in Istanbul.
2020 – Taal Volcano in the Philippines erupts, and kills 39 people.

Births

Pre-1600
1483 – Henry III of Nassau-Breda (d. 1538)
1562 – Charles Emmanuel I, Duke of Savoy (d. 1630)
1576 – Petrus Scriverius, Dutch historian and scholar (d. 1660)
1577 – Jan Baptist van Helmont, Flemish chemist and physician (d. 1644)
1588 – John Winthrop, English lawyer and politician, 2nd Governor of the Massachusetts Bay Colony (d. 1649)
1591 – Jusepe de Ribera, Spanish painter (d. 1652)
1597 – François Duquesnoy, Flemish sculptor and educator (d. 1643)
1598 – Jijabai Shahaji Bhosale, mother of Indian king Shivaji (d. 1674)

1601–1900
1628 – Charles Perrault, French author and academic (d. 1703)
1673 – Rosalba Carriera, Italian painter (d. 1757)
1694 – Godscall Paleologue, possibly last member of the Palaiologos dynasty (d. ????)
1711 – Gaetano Latilla, Italian composer (d. 1788)
1715 – Jacques Duphly, French organist and composer (d. 1789)
1716 – Antonio de Ulloa, Spanish general and politician, 1st Spanish Governor of Louisiana (d. 1795)
1721 – Duke Ferdinand of Brunswick-Wolfenbüttel, Prussian field marshal (d. 1792)
1723 – Samuel Langdon, American minister, theologian, and academic (d. 1797)
1724 – Frances Brooke, English author and playwright (d. 1789)
1729 – Edmund Burke, Irish philosopher, academic, and politician (d. 1797)
1746 – Johann Heinrich Pestalozzi, Swiss philosopher and educator (d. 1827)
1751 – Ferdinand I of the Two Sicilies (d. 1825)
1772 – Mikhail Speransky, Russian academic and politician (d. 1839)
1786 – Sir Robert Inglis, 2nd Baronet, English politician (d. 1855)
1792 – Johan August Arfwedson, Swedish chemist and academic (d. 1841)
1797 – Gideon Brecher, Austrian physician and author (d. 1873)
1799 – Priscilla Susan Bury, British botanist (d. 1872)
1822 – Étienne Lenoir, Belgian engineer, designed the internal combustion engine (d. 1900)
1837 – Adolf Jensen, German pianist and composer (d. 1879)
1849 – Jean Béraud, Russian-French painter and academic (d. 1935)
1853 – Gregorio Ricci-Curbastro, Italian mathematician (d. 1925)
1856 – John Singer Sargent, American painter and academic (d. 1925)
1863 – Swami Vivekananda, Indian monk and philosopher (d. 1902)
1869 – Bhagwan Das, Indian philosopher, academic, and politician (d. 1958)
1873 – Spyridon Louis, Greek runner (d. 1940)
1874 – Laura Adams Armer, American author and photographer (d. 1963)
1876 – Fevzi Çakmak, Turkish field marshal and politician, Prime Minister of the Turkish Provisional Government (d. 1950)
  1876   – Jack London, American novelist and journalist (d. 1916)
  1876   – Ermanno Wolf-Ferrari, Italian composer and educator (d. 1948)
1877 – Frank J. Corr, American lawyer and politician, 45th Mayor of Chicago (d. 1934)
1878 – Ferenc Molnár, Hungarian-American author and playwright (d. 1952)
1879 – Ray Harroun, American race car driver and engineer (d. 1968)
  1879   – Anton Uesson, Estonian engineer and politician, 17th Mayor of Tallinn (d. 1942)
1882 – Milton Sills, American actor and screenwriter (d. 1930)
1884 – Texas Guinan, American entertainer and bootlegger (d. 1933)
  1885   – Thomas Ashe, Irish Republican died while on Hunger Strike (d. 1917)
1889 – Mirza Basheer-ud-Din Mahmood Ahmad, Indian-Pakistani spiritual leader (d. 1965)
1890 – Johannes Vares, Estonian poet, physician, and politician (d. 1946)
1892 – Mikhail Gurevich, Russian engineer and businessman, co-founded the Mikoyan-Gurevich Design Bureau (d. 1976)
1893 – Hermann Göring, German commander, pilot, and politician, Minister President of Prussia (d. 1946)
  1893   – Alfred Rosenberg, Estonian-German architect and politician, Reich Minister for the Occupied Eastern Territories (d. 1946)
1894 – Georges Carpentier, French boxer and actor (d. 1975)
1895 – Leo Aryeh Mayer, Polish-Israeli scholar and academic (d. 1959)
1896 – Uberto De Morpurgo, Italian tennis player (d. 1961)
  1896   – David Wechsler, Romanian-American psychologist and author (d. 1981)
1899 – Pierre Bernac, French opera singer and educator (d. 1979)
  1899   – Paul Hermann Müller, Swiss chemist and academic, Nobel Prize laureate (d. 1965)

1901–present
1901 – Karl Künstler, German SS officer (d. 1945)
1903 – Igor Kurchatov, Russian physicist and academic (d. 1960)
  1903   – Andrew J. Transue, American politician and attorney (Morissette v. United States) (d. 1995)
1904 – Mississippi Fred McDowell, American singer-songwriter and guitarist (d. 1972)
1905 – Nihal Atsız, Turkish author, poet, and philosopher (d. 1975)
  1905   – James Bennett Griffin, American archaeologist and academic (d. 1997)
  1905   – Tex Ritter, American actor and singer (d. 1974)
1906 – Emmanuel Levinas, Lithuanian-French historian, philosopher, and academic (d. 1995)
1907 – Sergei Korolev, Russian colonel and engineer (d. 1966)
1908 – Jean Delannoy, French actor, director, and screenwriter (d. 2008)
  1908   – Clement Hurd, American illustrator (d. 1988)
1910 – Patsy Kelly, American actress and comedian (d. 1981)
  1910   – Luise Rainer, German-English actress (d. 2014)
1912 – Richard Kuremaa, Estonian footballer (d. 1991)
1914 – Mieko Kamiya, Japanese psychiatrist and psychologist (d. 1979)
1915 – Paul Jarrico, American screenwriter and producer (d. 1997)
  1915   – Joseph-Aurèle Plourde, Canadian archbishop and academic (d. 2013)
1916 – Ruth R. Benerito, American chemist and inventor (d. 2013)
  1916   – Mary Wilson, Baroness Wilson of Rievaulx, British poet and Spouse of the Prime Minister of the United Kingdom (d. 2018)
  1916   – P. W. Botha, South African politician, 8th Prime Minister of South Africa (d. 2006)
1917 – Walter Hendl, American pianist, composer, and conductor (d. 2007)
  1917   – Jimmy Skinner, Canadian ice hockey player and coach (d. 2007)
1920 – James Farmer, American activist and politician, co-founded Congress of Racial Equality (d. 1999)
  1920   – Jerzy Zubrzycki, Polish-Australian sociologist and academic (d. 2009)
1922 – Tadeusz Żychiewicz, Polish journalist and historian (d. 1994)
1923 – Ira Hayes, American marine who raised the U.S. flag on Iwo Jima (d. 1955)
1924 – Olivier Gendebien, Belgian racing driver and businessman (d. 1998)
1925 – Bill Burrud, American television host, producer, and actor (d. 1990)
1926 – Morton Feldman, American composer and academic (d. 1987)
  1926   – Ray Price, American singer-songwriter and guitarist (d. 2013)
1928 – Ruth Brown, American R&B singer-songwriter and actress (d. 2006) 
1929 – Alasdair MacIntyre, Scottish-American philosopher and academic
  1929   – Jaakko Hintikka, Finnish philosopher and logician (d. 2015)
1930 – Tim Horton, Canadian ice hockey player and businessman, founded Tim Hortons (d. 1974)
  1930   – Jennifer Johnston, Irish author and playwright
  1930   – Glenn Yarbrough, American singer and actor (d. 2016)
1932 – Des O'Connor, English entertainer, singer and TV presenter (d. 2020)
1933 – Pavlos Matesis, Greek author and playwright (d. 2013)
1934 – Alan Sharp, Scottish-American author and screenwriter (d. 2013)
  1934   – Mick Sullivan, English rugby player and coach (d. 2016)
1935 – Teresa del Conde, Mexican historian and critic (d. 2017)
  1935   – Kreskin, American mentalist
1936 – Jennifer Hilton, Baroness Hilton of Eggardon, English police officer and politician
  1936   – Raimonds Pauls, Latvian pianist and composer
  1936   – Brajanath Ratha, Indian poet and activist (d. 2014)
  1936   – Mufti Mohammad Sayeed, Indian lawyer and politician, Indian Minister of Home Affairs (d. 2016)
1937 – Shirley Eaton, English actress
1938 – Qazi Hussain Ahmad, Pakistani scholar and politician (d. 2013)
1940 – Bob Hewitt, Australian-South African tennis player
  1940   – Ronald Shannon Jackson, American drummer and composer (d. 2013)
  1940   – Dick Motz, New Zealand cricketer (d. 2007)
1941 – Long John Baldry, English-Canadian singer-songwriter and voice actor (d. 2005)
  1941   – Fiona Caldicott, English psychiatrist and psychotherapist (d. 2021)
  1941   – Chet Jastremski, American swimmer and physician (d. 2014)
1942 – Bernardine Dohrn, American domestic terrorist, political activist and academic
1944 – Hans Henning Atrott, German author and theorist
  1944   – Joe Frazier, American boxer (d. 2011)
  1944   – Cynthia Robinson, American R&B trumpet player and singer (d. 2015)
1945 – Maggie Bell, Scottish singer-songwriter
1946 – Hazel Cosgrove, Lady Cosgrove, Scottish lawyer and judge
  1946   – George Duke, American keyboard player, composer, and educator (d. 2013)
1947 – Richard Carwardine, English historian and academic
  1947   – Tom Dempsey, American football player and educator (d. 2020)
  1947   – Sally Hamwee, Baroness Hamwee, English politician
1948 – Kenny Allen, English footballer
  1948   – Anthony Andrews, English actor and producer
  1948   – Gordon Campbell, Canadian educator and politician, 34th Premier of British Columbia
  1948   – Brendan Foster, English runner and sportscaster
  1948   – William Nicholson, English author and screenwriter
1949 – Kentarō Haneda, Japanese pianist and composer (d. 2007)
  1949   – Ottmar Hitzfeld, German footballer and manager
  1949   – Hamadi Jebali, Tunisian engineer, journalist, and politician, 19th Prime Minister of Tunisia
  1949   – Haruki Murakami, Japanese novelist, short-story writer, and essayist
1950 – Sheila Jackson Lee, American lawyer, judge, and politician
  1950   – Göran Lindblad, Swedish dentist and politician
  1950   – Bob McEwen, American businessman and politician
  1950   – Dorrit Moussaieff, Israeli-Icelandic jewelry designer and businesswoman, 5th First Lady of Iceland
1951 – Kirstie Alley, American actress and producer (d. 2022)
  1951   – Chris Bell, American singer-songwriter and guitarist (d. 1978)
  1951   – Rush Limbaugh, American talk show host and author (d. 2021)
  1951   – Drew Pearson, American football player and sportscaster
1952 – Phil Perry, American singer-songwriter and producer
  1952   – Ricky Van Shelton, American country singer-songwriter and guitarist
  1952   – John Walker, New Zealand runner and politician
  1952   – Walter Mosley, American novelist
1953 – Mary Harron, Canadian director and screenwriter
1954 – Howard Stern, American radio host, actor, and author
  1954   – Martin Kylhammar, Swedish professor of culture and society
1955 – Tom Ardolino, American rock drummer (d. 2012)
1956 – Nikolai Noskov, Russian rock singer and singer-songwriter
1957 – John Lasseter, American animator, director, and producer
  1957   – Jeremy Sams, English director, playwright, and composer
1958 – Christiane Amanpour, English-born Iranian-American journalist
  1958   – Curt Fraser, American-Canadian ice hockey player and coach
1959 – B. Brian Blair, American wrestler and politician
  1959   – Per Gessle, Swedish singer-songwriter, guitarist, and producer
1960 – Oliver Platt, Canadian-American actor
  1960   – Dominique Wilkins, French-American basketball player and manager
1961 – Simon Russell Beale, Malaysia-born English actor and historian
1962 – Joe Quesada, American author and illustrator
  1962   – Richie Richardson, Antiguan cricketer
  1962   – Luna Vachon, American-Canadian wrestler and manager (d. 2010)
1963 – François Girard, Canadian director and screenwriter
  1963   – Nando Reis, Brazilian singer-songwriter, guitarist, and producer
1964 – Jeff Bezos, American computer scientist and businessman, founded Amazon.com
  1965   – Rob Zombie, American singer-songwriter, producer, actor, and director
1966 – Olivier Martinez, French actor
  1966   – Craig Parry, Australian golfer
1967 – Vendela Kirsebom, Norwegian-Swedish model and actress
1968 – Farrah Forke, American actress (d. 2022)
  1968   – Rachael Harris, American actress and comedian
  1968   – Junichi Masuda, Japanese director, producer, and composer
  1968   – Heather Mills, English businesswoman, activist and model
  1968   – Mauro Silva, Brazilian footballer
1969 – David Mitchell, English novelist
  1969   – Margaret Nagle, American screenwriter and producer
1970 – Raekwon, American rapper
  1970   – Zack de la Rocha, American singer-songwriter
1971 – Arman Alizad, Iranian-born Finnish tailor and television presenter
  1971   – Scott Burrell, American basketball player and coach
  1971   – Peter Madsen, Danish engineer, entrepreneur, and convicted murderer
1972 – Zabryna Guevara, American actress
  1972   – Toto Wolff, Austrian investor
1972 – Priyanka Gandhi, Indian politician
  1972   – Espen Knutsen, Norwegian ice hockey player and coach
  1972   – Paul Wilson, Australian cricketer and umpire
1973 – Brian Culbertson, American pianist and producer
  1973   – Hande Yener, Turkish singer-songwriter, producer, and actress
1974 – Melanie C, English singer-songwriter and actress 
  1974   – Tor Arne Hetland, Norwegian skier
1975 – Jason Freese, American saxophonist, songwriter, and producer
  1975   – Jocelyn Thibault, Canadian ice hockey player and coach
1977 – Yoandy Garlobo, Cuban baseball player
1978 – Luis Ayala, Mexican baseball player
  1978   – Maurizio Zaffiri, Italian rugby player
1979 – Marián Hossa, Slovak ice hockey player
  1979   – Lee Bo-young, South Korean actress and model
  1979   – Grzegorz Rasiak, Polish footballer
  1979   – David Zabriskie, American cyclist
1980 – Bobby Crosby, American baseball player
1981 – Amerie, American singer-songwriter, producer, and actress
  1981   – João Paulo Daniel, Brazilian footballer
  1981   – Dan Klecko, American football player
  1981   – Angus Macdonald, New Zealand rugby player
  1981   – Luis Ernesto Pérez, Mexican footballer
1982 – Paul-Henri Mathieu, French tennis player
  1982   – Hans Van Alphen, Belgian decathlete
  1982   – Dean Whitehead, English footballer
  1982   – Dontrelle Willis, American baseball player
1984 – Daniel Sepulveda, American football player
  1984   – Jonathan Zydko, French footballer
1985 – Artem Milevskyi, Ukrainian footballer
  1985   – Issa Rae, American actress, writer, director, producer and web series creator
  1985   – Borja Valero, Spanish footballer
1986 – Kehoma Brenner, German rugby player
  1986   – Miguel Ángel Nieto, Spanish footballer
1987 – Naya Rivera, American actress and singer (d. 2020)
  1987   – Salvatore Sirigu, Italian footballer
1988 – Claude Giroux, Canadian ice hockey player
1989 – Thiemo-Jérôme Kialka, German footballer
  1989   – Axel Witsel, Belgian footballer
1991 – Pixie Lott, English singer-songwriter, dancer, and actress
  1991   – Matt Srama, Australian rugby league player
1992 – Ishak Belfodil, Algerian footballer
  1992   – Samuele Longo, Italian footballer
1993 – Zayn Malik, English singer
  1993   – Simone Pecorini, Italian footballer
  1993   – Do Kyungsoo, South Korean singer
1995 – Sarah Mehain, Canadian Paralympic swimmer
  1995   – Alessio Romagnoli, Italian footballer
1996 – Ella Henderson, English singer and songwriter
2002 – Eva Lys, German tennis player

Deaths

Pre-1600
 690 – Benedict Biscop, English scholar and saint, founded the Monkwearmouth–Jarrow Abbey (b. 628)
 914 – Ahmad Samani, Samanid emir 
 947 – Sang Weihan, Chinese chief of staff (b. 898)
1140 – Louis I, Landgrave of Thuringia
1167 – Aelred of Rievaulx, English monk and saint (b. 1110)
1320 – John Dalderby, bishop of Lincoln
1322 – Marie of Brabant, Queen of France (b. 1254)
1405 – Eleanor Maltravers, English noblewoman (b. 1345)
1519 – Maximilian I, Holy Roman Emperor (b. 1459)

1601–1900
1665 – Pierre de Fermat, French mathematician and lawyer (b. 1601)
1674 – Giacomo Carissimi, Italian priest and composer (b. 1605)
1700 – Marguerite Bourgeoys, French-Canadian nun and saint, founded the Congregation of Notre Dame of Montreal (b. 1620)
1720 – William Ashhurst, English banker and politician, Lord Mayor of London (b. 1647)
1732 – John Horsley, English-Scottish historian and author (b. 1685)
1735 – John Eccles, English composer (b. 1668)
1759 – Anne, Princess Royal and Princess of Orange (b. 1709)
1765 – Johann Melchior Molter, German violinist and composer (b. 1696)
1777 – Hugh Mercer, Scottish-American general and physician (b. 1726)
1778 – François Bigot, French politician (b. 1703)
1781 – Richard Challoner, English bishop (b. 1691)
1829 – Karl Wilhelm Friedrich Schlegel, German philosopher, poet, and critic (b. 1772)
1833 – Marie-Antoine Carême, French chef (b. 1784)
1834 – William Grenville, 1st Baron Grenville, English academic and politician, Prime Minister of the United Kingdom (b. 1759)
1856 – Ľudovít Štúr, Slovak philologist and politician (b. 1815)
1861 – Václav Hanka, Czech philologist and author (b. 1791)
1892 – James Caulfeild, 3rd Earl of Charlemont, Irish politician, Lord Lieutenant of Tyrone (b. 1820)
  1892   – William Reeves, Irish bishop and historian (b. 1815)
1899 – Hiram Walker, American businessman, founded Canadian Club (b. 1816)

1901–present
1909 – Hermann Minkowski, Lithuanian-German mathematician and academic (b. 1864)
1911 – Andreas Papagiannakopoulos, Greek journalist, judge, and politician (b. 1845)
1916 – Georgios Theotokis, Greek lawyer and politician, 80th Prime Minister of Greece (b. 1844)
1921 – Gervase Elwes, English tenor and actor (b. 1866)
1926 – Austin Chapman, Australian businessman and politician, 4th Australian Minister for Defence (b. 1864)
1934 – Paul Kochanski, Polish violinist and composer (b. 1887)
1938 – Oscar Florianus Bluemner, German-American painter and illustrator (b. 1867)
1940 – Ralph Hitz, Austrian-American hotelier (b. 1891)
1940 – Edward Smith, English lieutenant, Victoria Cross recipient (b. 1898)
1943 – Jan Campert, Dutch journalist and critic (b. 1902)
1944 – Lance C. Wade, American commander and pilot (b. 1915)
1958 – Charles Hatfield, American meteorologist (b. 1875)
1960 – Nevil Shute, English engineer and author (b. 1899)
1962 – Ariadna Tyrkova-Williams, Russian journalist and activist (b. 1869)
1965 – Lorraine Hansberry, American author, playwright, and director (b. 1936)
1967 – Burhan Asaf Belge, Turkish diplomat (b. 1887)
1971 – John Tovey, 1st Baron Tovey, English admiral (b. 1885)
1973 – Roy Franklin Nichols, American historian and academic (b. 1896)
1974 – Princess Patricia of Connaught (b. 1886)
1976 – Agatha Christie, English crime novelist, short story writer, and playwright (b. 1890)
1977 – Henri-Georges Clouzot, French director and screenwriter (b. 1907)
1983 – Nikolai Podgorny, Ukrainian engineer and politician (b. 1903)
1988 – Connie Mulder, South African politician (b. 1925)
  1988   – Piero Taruffi, Italian racing driver and motorcycle racer (b. 1906)
1990 – Laurence J. Peter, Canadian-American author and educator (b. 1919)
1991 – Robert Jackson, Australian public servant and diplomat (b. 1911)
1992 – Kumar Gandharva, a Hindustani classical singer (b. 1924)
1994 – Gustav Naan, Estonian physicist and philosopher (b. 1919)
1996 – Joachim Nitsche, German mathematician and academic (b. 1926)
1997 – Jean-Edern Hallier, French author (b. 1936)
  1997   – Charles Brenton Huggins, Canadian-American physician and physiologist, Nobel Prize laureate (b. 1901)
1998 – Roger Clark, English racing driver (b. 1939)
1999 – Doug Wickenheiser, Canadian-American ice hockey player (b. 1961)
2000 – Marc Davis, American animator and screenwriter (b. 1913)
  2000   – Bobby Phills, American basketball player (b. 1969)
2001 – Luiz Bonfá, Brazilian guitarist and composer (b. 1922)
  2001   – William Redington Hewlett, American engineer and businessman, co-founded Hewlett-Packard (b. 1913)
2002 – Cyrus Vance, American lawyer and politician, 57th U.S. Secretary of State (b. 1917)
2003 – Dean Amadon, American ornithologist and author (b. 1912)
  2003   – Kinji Fukasaku, Japanese actor, director, and screenwriter (b. 1930)
  2003   – Leopoldo Galtieri, Argentine general and politician, 44th President of Argentina (b. 1926)
  2003   – Maurice Gibb, Manx-Australian singer-songwriter, guitarist, and producer (b. 1949)
  2003   – Alan Nunn May, English physicist and spy (b. 1911)
2004 – Olga Ladyzhenskaya, Russian mathematician and academic (b. 1921)
2005 – Amrish Puri, Indian actor (b. 1932)
2006 – Pablita Velarde, Santa Clara Pueblo (Native American) painter (b. 1918)
2007 – Alice Coltrane, American pianist and composer (b. 1937)
  2007   – James Killen, Australian soldier, lawyer, and politician, 38th Australian Minister for Defence (b. 1925)
2008 – Max Beck, American intersex advocate (b. 1966)
2009 – Claude Berri, French actor, director, and screenwriter (b. 1934)
2010 – Daniel Bensaïd, French philosopher and author (b. 1946)
  2010   – Hasib Sabbagh, Palestinian businessman and philanthropist, co-founded Consolidated Contractors Company (b. 1920)
2012 – Bjørn G. Andersen, Norwegian geologist and academic (b. 1924)
  2012   – Glenda Dickerson, American director, choreographer, and educator (b. 1945)
  2012   – Bill Janklow, American lawyer and politician, 27th Governor of South Dakota (b. 1939)
  2012   – Charles H. Price II, American businessman and diplomat, United States Ambassador to the United Kingdom (b. 1931)
  2012   – Jim Stanley, American football player and coach (b. 1935)
2013 – Precious Bryant, American singer-songwriter and guitarist (b. 1942)
  2013   – Flor María Chalbaud, First Lady of Venezuela (b. 1921)
  2013   – Eugene Patterson, American journalist and activist (b. 1923)
2014 – Alexandra Bastedo, English actress (b. 1946)
  2014   – Connie Binsfeld, American educator and politician, 58th Lieutenant Governor of Michigan (b. 1924)
  2014   – George Dement, American soldier, businessman, and politician (b. 1922)
2015 – Trevor Colbourn, American historian and academic (b. 1927)
  2015   – Robert Gover, American journalist and author (b. 1929)
  2015   – Carl Long, American baseball player (b. 1935)
  2015   – Elena Obraztsova, Russian soprano and actress (b. 1939)
  2015   – Inge Vermeulen, Brazilian-Dutch field hockey player (b. 1985)
2017 – William Peter Blatty, American writer and filmmaker (b. 1928)
  2017   – Graham Taylor, former Grimsby Town player and former manager of the England football team. (b. 1944)
2018 – Keith Jackson, American sports commentator and journalist (b. 1928)
2020 – Sir Roger Scruton, English philosopher and writer (b. 1944)
2022 – Ronnie Spector, American singer (b. 1943)
2023 – Lisa Marie Presley, American singer-songwriter (b. 1968)
  2023   – Sharad Yadav, Indian politician, 30th Minister of Civil Aviation, 29th Labour Minister (b. 1947)

Holidays and observances
 Christian feast day:
 Aelred of Rievaulx
 Benedict Biscop
 Bernard of Corleone
 Marguerite Bourgeoys
 Tatiana
 January 12 (Eastern Orthodox liturgics)
 Memorial Day (Turkmenistan)
 National Youth Day (India)
 Prosecutor General's Day (Russia)
 Zanzibar Revolution Day (Tanzania)
 Yennayer (Algeria)

References

External links

 BBC: On This Day
 
 Historical Events on January 12

Days of the year
January